Unleashed is the first book in the Sydney Rye mystery series by the author Emily Kimelman.

Plot
The book follows the life of Joy Humbolt, who has just ended it up with her boyfriend, fired from work, and bought a dog (Blue). She then gets a gig to take over someone's dog-walking route after which a series of mysteries unfold once she discovered a dead body while walking one of her dogs. She'll risk everything to bring the killer to justice...

Tag line
Justice with a Vengeance
She'll risk everything to bring a killer to justice...

Other books in the series
The series has nine books, namely:
 
 Unleashed—published 2011
 Death in the Dark—published 2012
 Insatiable—published 2012
 Strings of Glass—published 2013
 The Devil's Breath—published 2014
 Inviting Fire—published 2014
 Shadow Harvest—published 2015
 The Girl with the Gun
 In Sheep's Clothing

References

American mystery novels
2011 American novels